Guillermo Francisco Montero (born 1 January 1997) is a Bonairean footballer who currently plays for CSM Pașcani of Romania’s Liga III and the Bonaire national football team. In June 2017 one media outlet named him Bonaire's best footballer under twenty years old.

Club career
Montero began his senior career with SV Vitesse of the Bonaire League in 2013. For the 2015/2016 season, he was the league's top goal scorer with 15 goals in 14 matches. In February 2017, he went on trial with Dutch Lions FC, parent company of American clubs in Cincinnati, Dayton, and Houston, in Roosendaal, Netherlands.

In May 2017, it was announced that Montero had signed for Excelsior Maassluis of the Tweede Divisie, the third division of football in the Netherlands.

Later in 2017 Montero moved to USV Elinkwijk of the Dutch Hoofdklasse, the Dutch fifth division. Fellow Bonaire international Rachid Trenidad also spent time at the club around this time. Montero made his debut for the senior squad on 18 October 2017 in a 2–2 draw with RKSV DCG. He started the match and put the ball into the back of the net in the 20th minute of the match. However, the goal was ruled offside. Only eight minutes later, Montero struck again, this time counting for his first league goal for the club. Shortly thereafter, he scored several other goals including against SCH'44 on 30 October 2017, Hooglanderveen on 29 January 2018, and local rivals SV Kampong on 4 February 2018. On 28 February 2018, after scoring five league goals and twelve goals for USV Elinkwijk's youth team, it was announced that Montero's contract had been extended through the 2018–2019 season. In mid-March 2018, Montero was named "Player of the Match" for his performance against Voetbalvereniging IJsselstein (VVIJ).

In Summer 2019 Montero returned to the Tweede Divisie, signing for Kozakken Boys for the 2019–20 season. During his last season with the club, he was the reserve team's top scorer. In May 2021 Montero joined ASWH Ambacht, also of the Tweede Divisie, during the 2021–22 Tweede Divisie preseason.

After four years in the Netherlands without breaking into the first team of a club, Montero signed for Atlético Benidorm of the Spanish Divisiones Regionales de Fútbol in 2021. He left the club after the season when the new manager wanted to build the roster with local players. Following his departure he went on trial with IJsselmeervogels, A.S.D. Nocerina 1910, and GKS Jastrzębie before signing a professional contract with CSM Pașcani of Romania’s Liga III in February 2022. He made his league debut for the club as a starter on 11 March 2022 in a 1–1 draw with CS Dante Botoşani. The following week he started again in the club's 2–2 draw with CSM Bacău.

International career
Montero made his senior international debut on 7 September 2014 in a 1–4 defeat to Barbados during 2014 Caribbean Cup qualification after coming on as a 74th-minute substitute for Tom Homburg. In December 2015, Montero was named to a provisional squad by Bonaire head coach Ferdinand Bernabela in preparation for 2017 Caribbean Cup qualification. However, Bonaire ultimately did not enter the competition. He returned to the national team in 2019 for 2019–20 CONCACAF Nations League qualification.

International appearances

International statistics

References

External links
La Preferente profile
Kozakken Boys profile
National Football Teams profile
Voetbalnederland profile

Living people
1997 births
Bonaire footballers
Bonaire international footballers
Association football forwards